Halolli is a village in Belgaum district in the southern state of Karnataka, India.

The Malaprabha river is very near to the village.

References

Villages in Belagavi district